Isabella Rudolph (born 21 April 1995) is an Australian rules footballer who played for the Greater Western Sydney Giants in the AFL Women's competition. Rudolph was recruited by Greater Western Sydney as a free agent in October 2016. It was her only match for the season. She was delisted at the end of the 2017 season.

References

External links 

1995 births
Living people
Greater Western Sydney Giants (AFLW) players
Australian rules footballers from New South Wales